Isleta Pueblo is a station on the New Mexico Rail Runner Express commuter rail line, located in Isleta Pueblo, New Mexico, half a mile west of NM Highway 47 just off of Tribal Road 15. The station opened to service on December 17, 2008.

A shuttle connects this station to the nearby Isleta Casino. The station has free parking, with 75 spaces.

Each of the stations contains an icon to express each community's identity. The icon representing this station is the old Isleta Pueblo church.

External links
Stations, Isleta Pueblo Official Rail Runner site

Railway stations in New Mexico
Railway stations in the United States opened in 2008
Buildings and structures in Bernalillo County, New Mexico
Transportation in Bernalillo County, New Mexico